No. 102 Squadron  (Trisonics) is a fighter squadron and is equipped with Su-30MKI and based at Chabua Air Force Station.

History
The squadron was raised as the 102 Survey Flight at Barrackpore in December 1951 with one B-24. Later two Dakotas and two Doves were added and the unit moved to Palam.

In 1959, they were merged with the 106(SR) Squadron "Lynx".

102 Squadron reformed on the MiG-25RB/RU Foxbat (Garuda) in August 1981.

The Squadron ceased to exist in 2003 and all assets were transferred to 35 Squadron "Rapiers".

The squadron was re-formed in March 2011 and now fly the Su-30MKI.

Secret Reconnaissance Mission

In May 1997, a MiG-25R aircraft from 102 Squadron broke the sound barrier over Islamabad while undertaking one of its many secret reconnaissance missions over Pakistan, emitting a sonic boom. The sound was mistaken for a bomb blast. While the Indian Air Force made no official claims about this secret reconnaissance mission, Pakistan did make a statement. It claimed that the pilot aboard the Indian MiG-25 aircraft deliberately sent the sonic boom to remind the Pakistan Air Force that it had no equal in its inventory. 
Despite a fully-loaded weight of 40-tonnes, it flew 50 km per minute, faster than a bullet. At its fastest speed, it could even zip faster than missiles. Thus, it was considered the right weapon for spying.
The MiG-25 was fitted with powerful 1,200 mm cameras that captured photographs even as it flew thrice the speed of sound, at an altitude three times the height of Mount Everest. Its cameras could check on Delhi without leaving Bareilly. This meant that if it flew over Punjab or Kashmir, it could easily check on Pakistan too.

Aircraft

References

102